John Patrick "Jack" Kibbie (born July 14, 1929) is an American 
politician who served as an Iowa State Senator from the 4th district and President of the Iowa Senate. A Democrat, he has served in the Iowa Senate since 1988, and also served as Iowa Senate President.

Kibbie served on several committees in the Iowa Senate - the Agriculture committee; the Veterans Affairs committee; the Rules and Administration committee, where he was vice chair; the State Government committee, where he was vice chair; and the Ethics committee, where he was chair. His political experience includes an earlier term serving in the Iowa Senate senator from 1964 to 1968, serving as a representative in the Iowa House from 1960 to 1964, and serving as a member of the National Convention Platform Committee in 1968. Kibbie was interviewed by CNN on the 2020 Iowa caucus night, he voiced his support for former Vice President Joe Biden.

Kibbie was last re-elected in 2008 with 18,059 votes, defeating Grassroots for Life opponent Ken Vaske.

References

External links
Senator Jack Kibbie official Iowa Legislature site
Senator Jack Kibbie official Iowa General Assembly site
State Senator Jack Kibbie official constituency site
 

1929 births
Living people
Democratic Party members of the Iowa House of Representatives
Presidents of the Iowa Senate
Democratic Party Iowa state senators
People from Emmetsburg, Iowa